Seongsu-dong is a dong, or neighbourhood, of Seongdong-gu in Seoul, South Korea. It is further subdivided into Seongsu-dong 1-ga and Seongsu-dong 2-ga, and is served by Ddukseom Station and Seongsu Station on Seoul Subway Line 2 and by Seoul Forest Station on the Bundang Subway Line. Its most notable attraction is Seoul Forest, a public park. The neighborhood has become popular in recent years for its array of cafes and restaurants, many of which have been set up in repurposed factories and old residential buildings, earning it the nickname "The Brooklyn of Seoul". There are also various stores built inside repurposed shipping containers.

Seongsu-dong is a semi-industrial area with small factories adjacent to the Han River and Jungnangcheon Stream, and is expected to develop into a major transportation hub with the opening of Seoul Forest and the opening of the Bundang Line.

See also 
Administrative divisions of South Korea

References

External links
 Seongdong-gu Official site in English
 Seongdong-gu Official website
 Map of Seongdong-gu
 Seongsu 1ga-dong Resident office 

Neighbourhoods of Seongdong District